Maik Kischko (born 7 July 1966) is a German former professional footballer who played as a goalkeeper. He works as a goalkeeping coach for his former club 1. FC Lokomotive Leipzig.

References

External links
 

1966 births
Living people
German footballers
Association football goalkeepers
Bundesliga players
2. Bundesliga players
1. FC Lokomotive Leipzig players
FC Carl Zeiss Jena players
VfL Bochum players
Stuttgarter Kickers players
FC Erzgebirge Aue players
East German footballers
People from Bezirk Halle
People from Anhalt-Bitterfeld
Footballers from Saxony-Anhalt
Association football goalkeeping coaches
DDR-Oberliga players